Letosteine is a mucolytic patented (U.S. patent 6987120) by Piero del Soldato of Milan, Italy.  He filed his application in 2000.

References 

Antitussives
Carboxylic acids
Carboxylate esters
Ethyl esters
Thioethers
Thiazolidines